Petra Kvitová was the defending champion, but lost to Donna Vekić in the quarterfinals.

Kiki Bertens won the title, defeating Vekić in the final, 7–6(7–2), 6–4.

Seeds
The top four seeds received a bye into the second round.

Draw

Finals

Top half

Bottom half

Qualifying

Seeds

Qualifiers

Lucky loser

Qualifying draw

First qualifier

Second qualifier

Third qualifier

Fourth qualifier

External links
 Main draw
 Qualifying draw

St. Petersburg Ladies' Trophy - Singles
St. Petersburg Ladies' Trophy